Tridentarius dentatus, common name : the Toothed Conch,  is a species of sea snail, a marine gastropod mollusk in the family Strombidae, the true conchs.

Distribution
This species is distributed in the Red Sea, in the Indian Ocean along Aldabra, the Comores, Djibouti, Kenya, Madagascar, the Mascarene Basin, Mauritius, Mozambique, Réunion, the Seychelles, Somalia and Tanzania; in the Pacific Ocean in Polynesia and along Hawaii.

Description

The shell size varies between 19 mm and  65 mm.

References

 Walls, J.G. (1980). Conchs, tibias and harps. A survey of the molluscan families Strombidae and Harpidae. T.F.H. Publications Ltd, Hong Kong

External links
 

Strombidae
Gastropods described in 1758
Taxa named by Carl Linnaeus